Lahnda, also known as Lahndi or Western Punjabi, is a group of north-western Indo-Aryan language varieties spoken in parts of Pakistan and India. It is defined in the ISO 639 standard as a "macrolanguage" or as a "series of dialects" by other authors. Its validity as a genetic grouping is not certain. The terms "Lahnda" and "Western Punjabi" are exonyms employed by linguists, and are not used by the speakers themselves. 

Lahnda includes the following languages: Saraiki (spoken mostly in southern Pakistani Punjab by about 26 million people), the diverse varieties of Hindko (with almost five million speakers in north-western Punjab and neighbouring regions of Khyber Pakhtunkhwa, especially Hazara), Pahari/Pothwari (3.5 million speakers in north-central Punjab, Azad Kashmir and parts of Indian Jammu and Kashmir), Khetrani (20,000 speakers in Balochistan), and Inku (a possibly extinct language of Afghanistan). Ethnologue also subsumes under Lahnda a group of varieties that it labels as "Western Punjabi" (ISO 639-3 code: pnb) – the Majhi dialects transitional between Lahnda and Eastern Punjabi; these are spoken by about 66 million people.

Name
Lahnda means "western" in Punjabi. It was coined by William St. Clair Tisdall (in the form Lahindā) probably around 1890 and later adopted by a number of linguists — notably George Abraham Grierson — for a dialect group that had no general local name. This term has currency only among linguists.

Development
Baba Farid (c. 1188–1266), a celebrated and revered Sufi saint of the Punjab, composed poetry in the Lahnda lect. Saraiki and Hindko have been cultivated as literary languages. The development of the standard written Saraiki began in the 1960s. The national census of Pakistan has counted Saraiki and Hindko speakers since 1981.

Classification
Lahnda has several traits that distinguish it from Punjabi, such as a future tense in -s-. Like Sindhi, Siraiki retains breathy-voiced consonants, has developed implosives, and lacks tone. Hindko, also called Panjistani or (ambiguously) Pahari, is more like Punjabi in this regard, though the equivalent of the low-rising tone of Punjabi is a high-falling tone in Peshawar Hindko.

Sindhi, Lahnda and Punjabi form a dialect continuum with no clear-cut boundaries. Ethnologue classifies the western dialects of Punjabi as Lahnda, so that the Lahnda–Punjabi isogloss approximates the Pakistani–Indian border.

Notes

References

Bibliography 
  (This PDF contains multiple articles from the same issue.)

Further reading

External links 
 Map of Lahnda dialects from Grierson's early 20th-century Linguistic Survey of India

Northwestern Indo-Aryan languages
Punjabi dialects